The 63rd Infantry Division was a fictitious infantry division of the German Heer during World War II. No real division-size unit named 63rd Infantry Division was ever deployed in combat, but the name was given to a far smaller military unit. A reference was first made to the 63rd Infantry Division in a German Schematische Kriegsgliederung document dated 12 April 1945, where the fictitious division was listed among the reserves of Oberkommando West. In truth, the troops dubbed 63rd Infantry Division were the Regiment Alvensleben. The code name was assigned to the regiment on 22 March 1945.

The 63rd Infantry Division was one of the four divisions formed in the occupied Netherlands following an order on 28 February 1945. The other decoy formations formed in this way were the 219th, 249th, and 703rd divisions.

References 

Infantry divisions of Germany during World War II
Fictional units of World War II